Palmer Municipal Airport  is a public airport located  southeast of the central business district of Palmer, a city in Matanuska-Susitna Borough, Alaska, United States. This airport is owned by the City of Palmer.

Facilities 
Palmer Municipal Airport has three runways:
 Runway 9/27: 3,617 x 75 ft. (1,102 x 23 m), Surface: Asphalt
 Runway 16/34: 6,009 x 100 ft. (1,832 x 30 m), Surface: Asphalt
 Runway 16S/34S: 1,560 x 60 ft. (475 x 18 m), Surface: Gravel

There are 227 aircraft based at this airport: 88% single engine, 7% multi-engine, 3% helicopters and 2% gliders.

References

External links 
 Palmer Municipal Airport (page at City of Palmer web site)
 Alaska FAA airport diagram (GIF)

Airports in Matanuska-Susitna Borough, Alaska